The 1926 Springfield Red and White football team was an American football team that represented Springfield College as an independent during the 1926 college football season. Led by third-year head coach John L. Rothacher, Springfield compiled a record of 6–2.

Schedule

References

Springfield
Springfield Pride football seasons
Springfield Red and White football